Football Club Gandzasar Kapan, commonly known as Gandzasar, is an Armenian football club based in the town of Kapan, Syunik Province. Translated from the Armenian, "Gandz-a-sar" simply means "Treasure Mountain". The club headquarters are located on Shinararner street 1, Kapan. The Gandzasar Kapan Training Centre is located at the eastern outskirts of the town of Kapan.

The club is under the ownership of Zangezur Copper and Molybdenum Combine Closed Joint-Stock Company since 25 February 2015.

History
The club was founded in 2004 and made their debut in the Armenian football league system in the 2004 Armenian First League competition. They spent 2 years playing in the Armenian First League before getting promoted to the Armenian Premier League for the 2006 season.

As of 2014, Gandzasar Kapan play in the Armenian Premier League, the top division in Armenian football. The home ground of team is the Gandzasar Stadium.

The club also runs a reserve team known as Gandzasar Kapan-2, which played in the First Division.

On 3 November 2020, Gandzasar Kapan announced that they were withdrawing from the Armenian Premier League and Armenian Cup due to the ongoing financial constraints relating to the ongoing COVID-19 pandemic in Armenia and the 2020 Nagorno-Karabakh conflict. They are currently playing in the Armenian First League.

Domestic history

European history

Honours
Armenian Premier League
 Runners-up: 2016–17
 Third: 2008, 2011, 2012–13, 2017–18

Armenian Cup
 Winners: 2017–18
 Runners-up: 2013–14

Armenian Super Cup
 Runners-up: 2018

Stadium

The club play their home games at the Gandzasar Stadium, also known as Kapan City Stadium, which has a capacity of 3,500. It is situated at the centre of the town of Kapan, on the left bank of Voghji River.

At the beginning of 2017 the team temporarily moved to the Vazgen Sargsyan Republican Stadium in Yerevan due to renovation works at the Gandzasar Stadium.

Youth academy

Gandzasar Kapan run their own youth training academy in the town of Kapan since its inauguration in May 2013. Being home to natural-grass as well as artificial-turf training pitches, the centre occupies an area of 35,000 m².

In addition to Kapan, the club also runs a football school in the Shengavit District of the capital Yerevan.

Players

Current squad

Gandzasar Kapan-2

FC Gandzasar Kapan's reserve squad played as Gandzasar Kapan-2 in the Armenian First League. They played their home games at the training field with artificial turf of the Gandzasar Kapan Training Centre.

Current squad

Personnel

Management

Technical staff

Managerial history
 Albert Sarkisyan (1 February 2006 – 1 December 2006)
 Souren Barseghyan (2007)
 Abraham Khashmanyan (2007)
 Samvel Petrosyan (2007–09)
 Slava Gabrielyan (1 July 2009–10)
 Albert Sarkisyan (20 April 2010 – 20 December 2010)
 Abraham Khashmanyan (2010–12)
 Samvel Sargsyan (24 May 2012 – 12 September 12)
 Sevada Arzumanyan (8 September 2012 – 14 April 2014)
 Serhiy Puchkov (30 April 2014 – 2 December 2014)
 Ashot Barseghyan (11 March 2015 – 12 July 2017)
 Karen Barseghyan (13 July 2017 – 26 March 2018)
 Ashot Barseghyan (26 March 2018 – 30 April 2019)
 Armen Petrosyan (1 May 2019 – )

References

External links
Gandzasar at www.Weltfussball.de

 
2004 establishments in Armenia
Association football clubs established in 2004
Gandzasar